Francisco de Paula Linares Alcántara (13 April 1825 – 30 November 1878) was the president of Venezuela (1877–1878) and a member of the Liberal Party of Venezuela.

Personal life
Francisco Linares Alcántara was born on April 13, 1825 in Turmero, Aragua to General Francisco de Paula Alcántara and Trinidad Linares. His father was one of the heroes of the Venezuelan War of Independence.

Francisco Linares Alcántara later married to Belén Esteves Yánes, who served as First Lady of Venezuela from 1877 to 1878.

Career 
Francisco Linares Alcántara began his career as a soldier in 1846 and fought during the insurrections carried out by Ezequiel Zamora and Francisco Rangel. Due to the political instability in Venezuela from 1847 to 1858, Alcántara also fought to defend state institutions during the administrations of Jose Tadeo Monagas and Jose Gregorio Monagas. By 1854, he became a deputy to the National Congress from the state of Aragua before fighting again during the Federal War (1858-1863) and along with Antonio Guzman Blanco for the Liberal cause between 1868 and 1870.

Alcántara was elected president in February 1877 and his administration became known for its liberal policies such as more autonomy given to the states, political amnesties, and increased freedom of the press.

Gallery

See also 
Revindicating Revolution
List of presidents of Venezuela

References 

  Official biography
  Francisco Linares Alcántara - “Presidentes Constitucionales de Venezuela”

Presidents of Venezuela
People from Turmero
1825 births
1878 deaths
Great Liberal Party of Venezuela politicians
Venezuelan people of Spanish descent
Burials at the National Pantheon of Venezuela